Victor Milner, A.S.C. (December 15, 1893 – October 29, 1972) (sometimes Victor Miller) was an American cinematographer. He was nominated for ten cinematography Academy Awards, winning once for 1934 Cleopatra. Milner worked on more than 130 films, including dramas (Broken Lullaby), comedies (Unfaithfully Yours), film noir (Dark City), and Westerns (The Furies). He worked for large production companies like Metro-Goldwyn-Mayer, Universal, and Paramount during his film career.

Early life
Victor Milner was born on 15 December 1893 in Philadelphia, Pennsylvania. When he was 12, his family moved to New York City. As a teenager, he was sometimes put in charge of operating the projector at movies when the movie projector's girlfriend came to visit. Milner later got his projectioner's license and worked as a projectionist. In 1912, he taught Calvin Coolidge how to use a camera.

Career

Milner was hired by Eberhard Schneider, a film equipment manufacturer. He worked as a projectionist and ran supply runs for Schneider. During this time, Milner shot Hiawatha: The Indian Passion Play in 1913 as his first film. In 1914, he managed to photograph a mine strike in Trinidad, Colorado.

Milner was later sent to Galveston, Texas to embark on a destroyer; however, his orders never arrived by mail. Instead, Milner was hired as a private photographer and could travel extensively, even spending nine months in the Belgian Congo taking pictures of the wildlife and people.  Milner was later hired by Pathe Freres News Reel, and his first responsibility there was to film marathon races at Union Heights. As part of his job, Milner went on a world tour with the New York Giants and the Chicago White Sox.

Milner was able to go on Woodrow Wilson's first campaign tour, where he became acquainted with Teddy Roosevelt. It was reported that Milner stepped in front of Roosevelt on one occasion to take a photograph. Roosevelt was angered at first but simply requested a copy of the picture.
  
When Milner returned to the United States, he was married to Margaret Schneider, the daughter of Eberhard Schneider, on November 1, 1916.
In 1916 while on his honeymoon, he was hired by the Balboa Amusement Producing Company in Long Beach, California as a cameraman. He worked for Balboa for a year before he went to work for Thomas H. Ince in the William S. Hart unit. Throughout his career, he worked as a second cameraman for 17 films for William S. Hart. He also later worked with the Constance Talmage Company, and at large production companies like Metro-Goldwyn-Mayer, Universal, and he went to Paramount in 1925.

Later Milner became known for the epic look he lent to Cecil B. DeMille film productions. He worked with DeMille for ten years, and helped him direct movies in Technicolor. Milner also worked with other icons in the film industry including Victor Fleming, Raoul Walsh, Preston Sturges, and Ernst Lubitsch.

Milner was captured for three days by Russians with his son, Victor Milner Jr., in 1949. The two were on a trip in Berlin after Milner worked on a film project in Italy, when they were arrested by Soviet officials. They had gotten lost and asked a Russian soldier for directions. They were well-treated, however. Milner retired in 1953 after he completed the film Jeopardy. He died in 1972, having worked on over 130 films throughout his career.

Awards and accomplishments
Milner was nominated for nine Academy Awards during his career, winning one for cinematography in 1934 for the film Cleopatra. Milner received several nominations for in the category of cinematography in the Academy Awards, including The Crusades in 1935, The General Died at Dawn in 1936, and The Buccaneer in the 1938 awards. Milner was also an honorary member of the American Institute of Cinematography. Milner was a founding member of the American Society of Cinematographers and became its president from 1937 to 1939. Milner was featured on the cover of the Who's Who in 1934, and appeared on the cover of American Cinematographer: The Motion Picture Camera Magazine in April 1935.

Selected filmography

 Haunting Shadows (1919)
 Dice of Destiny (1920)
 Her Unwilling Husband (1920)
 Felix O'Day (1920)
 Play Square (1921)
 What Love Will Do (1921)
 Live Wires (1921)
 Shadows of Conscience (1921)
 When We Were 21 (1921)
 Cave Girl (1921)
 A Dangerous Game (1922)
 Gossip (1923)
 Cause for Divorce (1923)
 Her Night of Romance (1924)
 The Red Lily (1924)
 On the Stroke of Three (1924)
 Thy Name Is Woman (1924)
 East of Suez (1925)
 Learning to Love (1925)
 Brand of Cowardice (1925)
 The Wanderer (1925)
 The Cat's Pajamas (1926)
 The Wanderer (1926)
 Children of Divorce (1927)
 The Way of All Flesh (1927)
 Loves of an Actress (1928)
 The Woman from Moscow (1928)
 Sins of the Fathers (1928)
 The Love Parade (1929)
 The Marriage Playground (1929)
 Let's Go Native (1930)
 Monte Carlo (1930)
 Paramount on Parade (1930)
 The Texan (1930)
 No Limit (1931)
 I Take This Woman (1931)
 Trouble in Paradise (1932)
 The Man I Killed (1932)
 Broken Lullaby (1932)
 One Hour with You (1932)
 The Song of Songs (1933)
 Design for Living (1933)
 Luxury Liner (1933)
 Cleopatra (1934)
 The Crusades (1935)
 The Gilded Lily (1935)
 So Red the Rose (1935)
 The General Died at Dawn (1936)
 The Plainsman (1936)
 Desire (1936)
 Artists and Models (1937)
 The Buccaneer (1938)
 College Swing (1938)
 Touchdown, Army (1938)
 Union Pacific (1939)
 The Great Victor Herbert (1939)
 Northwest Mounted Police (1940)
 Christmas in July (1940)
 The Lady Eve (1941)
 The Monster and the Girl (1941)
 My Life with Caroline (1941)
 Reap the Wild Wind (1942)
 The Palm Beach Story (1942)
 The Story of Dr. Wassell (1944)
 The Great Moment (1944)
 The Princess and the Pirate (1944)
 The Strange Love of Martha Ivers (1946)
 The Other Love (1947)
 Unfaithfully Yours (1948)
 The Furies (1950)
 Dark City (1950)
 Carrie (1952)
 Jeopardy (1953)

References

External links

 
 
 Victor Milner papers, MSS 1965 at L. Tom Perry Special Collections, Brigham Young University

1893 births
1972 deaths
Artists from Philadelphia
American cinematographers
Burials at Forest Lawn Memorial Park (Hollywood Hills)
Best Cinematographer Academy Award winners
Harold B. Lee Library-related film articles